Saurabh Singh is an Indian politician and a member of 17th Legislative Assembly, Uttar Pradesh of India. He represents the Kasta constituency in Lakhimpur district of Uttar Pradesh.

Political career
Saurabh Singh contested 17th Uttar Pradesh Assembly Election as Bharatiya Janata Party candidate and defeated his close contestant Sunil Kumar Lala from Samajwadi Party with a margin of 24,273 votes.

Posts held

References

Uttar Pradesh MLAs 2017–2022
Bharatiya Janata Party politicians from Uttar Pradesh
Year of birth missing (living people)
Living people
Uttar Pradesh MLAs 2022–2027